Walter Walford Johnson (April 16, 1904 – March 23, 1987) was an American businessman and Democratic politician who served as the 32nd governor of the state of Colorado from 1950 to 1951. He was the first governor to have been born in the 20th century.

Walter Walfred Johnson was born in Pueblo, Colorado on April 16, 1904.  He married Neva Morrow in 1922.  The couple had two children, Winnifred and Walfred.  Johnson developed real estate and insurance businesses in Pueblo.

In 1940, Johnson was elected to the Colorado State Senate.  In 1948, he was elected Lieutenant Governor of Colorado.  In April 1950, Colorado Governor William Lee Knous resigned to become a federal district judge in Denver.  Johnson succeeded Knous as governor and completed the remaining nine months of Knous' term.  Johnson ran unsuccessfully against Republican Dan Thornton for a full gubernatorial term in 1950.

In 1970, Johnson retired to Tempe, Arizona. He died there after a brief illness on March 23, 1987, 24 days short of his 83rd birthday, and is buried at Pueblo.

See also
History of Colorado
Law and government of Colorado
List of governors of Colorado
State of Colorado

Further reading
Abbott, Carl; Leonard, Stephen; and McComb, David. Colorado. Colorado Associated University Press, Boulder Colorado, 1982.
Athearn, Robert G. The Coloradans. University of New Mexico Press, Albuquerque, 1976.
Newspaper Files of Walter W. Johnson. Denver Public Library Western History Collection.
Ubbelohde, Carl, Benson, Maxine, and Smith, Duane. Colorado History. Boulder, CO., Pruett Publishing Co., 1972.
Obituary, Rocky Mountain News, March 25, 1987, p. 147 and biographical article, June 25, 1955, p. 28.

External links
The Governors of Colorado
The Governor Walter W. Johnson Collection at the Colorado State Archives

1904 births
1987 deaths
People from Pueblo, Colorado
Democratic Party governors of Colorado
Businesspeople from Colorado
20th-century American businesspeople
20th-century American politicians